Waar Parriwar is a singing reality television show on Sony Entertainment Television (India) in 2008. It featured Urmila Matondkar as the host, and Jatin Pandit as the in-house guru and trainer to the competing families.

Concept 
The show is a unique show which seamlessly blends, family bond with their love for music. It followed the journey of families from across India – their trials and tribulations, highs of victory and disappointment of defeat, their love for each other during tough times and eventually culminate in finding "Sangeet Ka Naya Gharana". The families competed against each other to win the title of best "Sangeet Ka Naya Gharana".

The show was judged by different celebrity judges each week and by India's foremost music families combined with audience voting.

The wildcard entry took place on Monday 14 July in which Ali Ghani Parriwar and Ramshankar Parriwar (now known as Shambhu Pandit Parriwar) have won among all other participants. Misbah was the runner up and with maximum Performer of the day reward.

Grand-Finale
Sharma Parriwar - Winner
Ali Parriwar - Runner-up

Celebrity judges 
Sneha Pant --- Special ex-host every Wednesday
Ishita Arun --- New Host every Wednesday
Ismail Darbar & Ayesha Darbar --- Week 1
Shivkumar Sharma & Rahul Sharma --- Week 2
Daler Mehndi & Mika Singh --- Week 3
Aadesh Srivastav & Vijeta Pandit --- Week 4
Shaan & Sonali Mukherjee --- Week 5
Jatin Pandit & Lalit Pandit aka Jatin Lalit --- Week 6
Udit Narayan & Aditya Narayan --- Week 7
Bappi Lahiri & Reema Lahiri --- Week 8 
Salman Khan --- Week 8 (on Wednesday)
Bappi Lahiri & Bappa Lahiri --- Week 9
Roop Kumar Rathod & Sonali Rathod --- Week 10
Kumar Sanu & Udit Narayan --- Week 11 - 'til end! (became permanent judges until the end of the show along with Jatin Pandit)
Shiney Ahuja & Kaveri Jha --- Week 16 (To promote their movie Hijack)
Pandit Jasraj, Durga Jasraj, & Sharang Dev on Grand-Finale.

Contestants

References

External links 
Official Site on Sony TV India
Waar Parriwar on SET Asia

Indian reality television series
Sony Entertainment Television original programming